Ignace Fougeron, also known as Ignatius Fougeron or J. Fougeron, was a British engraver active from 1750 to 1782. He was likely from a Huguenot family living in London.

Works
Fougeron produced a handcolored, accurate engraving of An East View of the Great Cataract of Niagara after Thomas Davies, which was published in his Six Views of North American Waterfalls (–68).

References

External links 

 Ignace Fougeron in the Stuttgart Database of Scientific Illustrators

Year of birth missing
Year of death missing
British engravers